Transmissibility is the ratio of output to input.

It is defined as the ratio of the force transmitted to the force applied. Transmitted force implies the one which is being transmitted to the foundation or to the body of a particular system. Applied force is the external agent that cause the force to be generated in the first place and be transmitted. 

Transmissibility: 

 means amplification and maximum amplification occurs when forcing frequency and natural frequency of the system coincide.

There is no unit designation for transmissibility, although it may sometimes be referred to as the Q factor.

The transmissibility is used in calculation of passive hon efficiency.

The lesser the transmissibility the better is the damping or the isolation system.

 is Desirable, 
 acts as a rigid body,
 is Undesirable

See also 

 Q factor

Engineering ratios